Gilabad (also Romanized as Gīlābād) is a village in Qareh Toghan Rural District, in the Central District of Neka County, Mazandaran Province, Iran. At the 2006 census, its population was 195, in 42 families.

References 

Populated places in Neka County